Juan Manuel Llop (born 1 June 1963 in Arroyo Dulce, Santa Fe) is an Argentine football manager and former player who played as a midfielder.

Before taking up management Llop had a 15-year career as a football player, he made appearances for several clubs, most notably for Newell's Old Boys under coaches José Yudica and Marcelo Bielsa during the club's golden era (1987–1992), winning 3 Argentine titles.

Titles as a player

Managerial career

Llop became manager of Newell's Old Boys in 2001, but his reign only lasted 19 games before he was replaced. He then honed his skills as a manager in Paraguay, coaching Tacuary and Libertad until he returned to Argentina to take over Godoy Cruz de Mendoza, an insignificant provincial team  struggling in the Second Division. The turnaround at the club was remarkable, they won the Primera B Nacional title and promotion to the Primera División in his first full season as their manager.

Godoy Cruz found themselves in the Primera for the first time in their history, making them the first team from Mendoza Province ever to play in the Argentine first division league (other than the brief relocation to Mendoza of Argentinos Juniors in the 1990s). Godoy Cruz were relegated at the end of the 2006-2007 season despite a strong 10th-place finish.

In 2007 Llop was signed as the new manager of Club Atlético Banfield in the Primera Division, he was replaced by Miguel Jerez in 2008.

After that, he replaced Miguel Micó as manager for Racing Club de Avellaneda. The team finished last in the tournament but saved itself from relegation by beating Belgrano de Córdoba in Promoción. In 2009, he was sacked by Racing following a 2-0 defeat in the Avellaneda derby.

References

External links
 Argentine Primera managerial statistics
 Juan Manuel Llop at Soccerway
 Juan Manuel Llop at Footballdatabase

1963 births
Living people
Sportspeople from Buenos Aires Province
Argentine footballers
Newell's Old Boys footballers
Estudiantes de La Plata footballers
Quilmes Atlético Club footballers
San Martín de Tucumán footballers
Argentine Primera División players
Argentine football managers
Newell's Old Boys managers
Club Tacuary managers
Club Libertad managers
Godoy Cruz Antonio Tomba managers
Club Atlético Banfield managers
Racing Club de Avellaneda managers
Atlético de Rafaela managers
Club Atlético Platense managers
Barcelona S.C. managers
Santiago Wanderers managers
Club Atlético Huracán managers
C.D. Jorge Wilstermann managers
Expatriate football managers in Chile
Expatriate football managers in Ecuador
Expatriate football managers in Paraguay
Estudiantes de Río Cuarto footballers
Association football defenders
Oriente Petrolero managers
Carlos A. Mannucci managers